The 2013–14 season is the 126th competitive association football season in India.

Changes in the I-League
New direct-entry sides to the 2013–14 I-League:
 Bengaluru FC

Teams promoted to the 2013–14 I-League:
 Mohammedan
 Rangdajied United

Teams expelled from the 2012–13 I-League:
 Air India
 ONGC

Teams relegated from the 2012–13 I-League:
 United Sikkim

Internationals

Men

2013 SAFF Championship

International Friendlies

I-League

Transfers

References

 
Seasons in Indian football